The Boy from Mercury (1996) is an Irish film, the debut of writer and director Martin Duffy.  The film concerns the science-fiction daydreams of a young boy in 1960 Dublin.  Upon release, the film received international critical acclaim, and several awards, though was commercially unsuccessful.  It was the first time actors Rita Tushingham and Tom Courtenay had appeared on screen together since Doctor Zhivago thirty years earlier.  The film was also the debut of the Irish actor James Hickey.

The book of the making of the film, The Road to Mercury, written by the director and released in 2006 by Ogma Press.

Cast
Rita Tushingham
Tom Courtenay
Hugh O'Conor
James Hickey

Release
The film opened on 5 screens in Ireland on 6 December 1996 and grossed IR£3,806 in its first week.

References

External links

1996 films
1996 drama films
Films about children
Films about families
Films about school violence
Films set in 1960
Films set in Ireland
Irish drama films
English-language Irish films
1990s English-language films